Winstead House is a historic Italianate house in Franklin, Tennessee built c.1870 that was listed on the National Register of Historic Places in 1979 together with  of land.  It is also a contributing property in the Franklin Historic District.

It was built by William O'Neal Perkins on the foundation of a former house, the McNutt House, which burned c.1865.  Perkins used brick and stone materials from a building on the court square, Public Office, which he had bought and demolished.  It is a two-story, five bay house.  Its foundation, water table, and quoins are stone; the brick walls are laid in American common bond.  It has a massive ornate cornice supported by heavy paired brackets.

It was owned by Asa Hickman Jewell, II and his wife, Margaret Loring Jewell.

It is now the administration building for the O'More College of Design.

References

Houses on the National Register of Historic Places in Tennessee
Houses in Franklin, Tennessee
Italianate architecture in Tennessee
Houses completed in 1870
National Register of Historic Places in Williamson County, Tennessee
1870 establishments in Tennessee